Marina Razum (born 25 February 1992) is a Croatian handball player for MKS Lublin and the Croatian national team.

She participated at the 2016 European Women's Handball Championship.

References

1992 births
Living people
Croatian female handball players
Handball players from Zagreb
Expatriate handball players
Croatian expatriate sportspeople in Romania 
Croatian expatriate sportspeople in Poland
21st-century Croatian women